The second season of Teenage Mutant Ninja Turtles originally aired between November 8, 2003 and October 2, 2004, beginning with the "Turtles in Space, Part 1: The Fugitoid" episode. The episodes were first released on DVD in eight volumes, TMNT Volume nine through Volume fourteen. The volumes were released From May 18, 2004 through January 18, 2005. The episodes were later released in 2 part season sets; part 1 was released on February 19, 2008, containing the first 12 episodes of the season, and part 2 was released on October 28, 2008 with the final 14 episodes.

Story
Picking up from the first season's cliffhanger, the Turtles find themselves teleported to the alien world of D'Hoonibb, where they immediately are caught up in a war between the Triceraton Republic and the Galactic Federation. The two races are fighting over Professor Honeycutt, who has the plans for a teleportation device that both sides seek for their war efforts against each other. The Turtles end up on the Triceraton home world, and after saving Honeycutt, are teleported back to Earth by the Utroms. The aliens reveal themselves to be benevolent and reunite the Turtles with Splinter, who they had healed after their last confrontation with the Shredder, who survived the battle as well. His attack is foiled when the Utroms are able to teleport to their home planet with Honeycutt, and his true nature as an Utrom criminal named Ch'rell is revealed before he is defeated once again.

In the wake of the Shredder's defeat, a gang war erupts over control of his lost territory by the remainder of the Foot Clan, the Purple Dragons (led by Hun), and the New York mafia (aided by Baxter Stockman). Leonardo and Raphael argue over their place in fighting in the war, but the Turtles end up aiding Karai, the Shredder's adopted daughter, in claiming control of the New York Foot Clan and restoring order to the city. Though they part with a friendly ceasefire, the Shredder is revealed to have survived yet again, and Karai's loyalty to her father conflicting with her honor becomes a critical dilemma for her for the remainder of the series. The Turtles meet a Triceraton named Zog who has become stranded on earth after they returned and is delusional for breathing oxygen and mistakes them with Triceraton officers, he helps them to attack a freighter belonging to the foot and stop the Shredder from creating an army of advanced robotic soldiers.

In the season finale, the Turtles follow Splinter to the Battle Nexus, a kingdom where a tournament is held between the multiverse's greatest warriors by the Ultimate Daimyo. The Turtles meet new allies in the form of Miyamoto Usagi and Murakami Gennosuke, and end up working to defeat an attempted coup on the Daimyo's life by his own son and Drako, Splinter's old foe.

Cast
 Michael Sinterniklaas as Leo: the leader of the Turtles who seeks an alliance with Karai. (26 episodes)
 Frank Frankson as Raph: Leo's second-in-command who can be stubborn. (26 episodes)
 Wayne Grayson as Mikey: the Turtles' youngest member and a large source of comic relief. (26 episodes)
 Sam Riegel as Donnie: the Turtles' genius inventor. (26 episodes)

Supporting 
 Darren Dunstan as Splinter: the Turtles' sensei and adopted father, the former pet of Hamato Yoshi. (18 episodes; (has no lines in episode 13))
 Veronica Taylor as April: a woman who develops feelings for Casey Jones. (9 episodes; (has no lines in episode 1))
 Marc Thompson as Casey: an ally of the Turtles who develops mutual feelings for April O'Neil. (11 episodes; (has no lines in episode 1))
 Dan Green as Mortu: the leader of the benevolent Utroms.
 Oliver Wyman as Professor Honeycutt/Fugitoid: a Federation scientist whose mind was accidentally uploaded into an android's body, who possesses the plans for a teleportation device warred over by the Triceratons and Federation.

Villains
 Scottie Ray as Ch'rell / Oroku Saki / The Shredder: the main antagonist of the series and leader of the Foot Clan, whose true nature is revealed early into the season. (7 episodes)
 Greg Carey as Hun: the Shredder's second-in-command, a hulking gangster and the leader of the Purple Dragons. Briefly broke away from the Foot to run the Purple Dragons full-time following the Shredder's disappearance, but later re-joined after the Shredder's return, though he lost his position as the Shredder's lieutenant to Karai.
 Scott Williams as Baxter Stockman: a brilliant, maniacal scientist who abandons the Foot for a majority of the season. (9 episodes)
 Karen Neil as Karai: the adopted daughter of the Shredder whose devoted service and loyalty to him conflicts with her sense of honor. After the Shredder returns, she becomes his new second-in-command.
 Oliver Wyman as General Blanque: the leader of the Federation.
 Michael Alston Bailey as
 Zanramon: the despotic Prime Leader of the Triceraton Republic.
 Big Boss: the leader of the Mob.
 Dan Green as Commander Mozar: the second in command of the Triceraton Republic.

Recurring
 Marc Thompson as
 The Ultimate Daimyo: a warrior king who hosts a tournament of the multiverse's greatest warriors every 3 years.
 Drako: a draconian warrior who carries a grudge towards Splinter for besting him in the Battle Nexus tournament years ago.
 Jason Griffith as Miyamoto Usagi: an anthropomorphic rabbit samurai who the Turtles meet in the Battle Nexus tournament.
 Frederick B. Owens as
 Traximus: an honorable Triceraton gladiator the Turtles befriend.
 Leatherhead: a mutant crocodile tricked into helping Baxter Stockman.
 Ted Lewis as
 Ue-Sama: a warrior prince who goes by the title "Ultimate Ninja", who seeks a battle with Leonardo.
 Kluh: a hulking Levram warrior who becomes an enemy of Michelangelo.
 Oliver Wyman as Gyoji: the referee of the Battle Nexus.

Crew
Teenage Mutant Ninja Turtles was produced by Mirage Studios, 4 Kids Entertainment, 4Kids Productions, and Dong Woo Animation and distributed by 4 Kids Entertainment and was aired on Fox's Saturday morning kids' block in the US. The producers were Gary Richardson, Frederick U. Fierst, and Joellyn Marlow for the American team; Tae Ho Han was the producer for the Korean team.

Reception
The second season also received positive acclaim like its predecessor. Episodes such as the Turtles in Space arc and the City at War arc were critically acclaimed. As of October 2004 it had 3.06 million views on the 4kids website. Its rank was 90%.

Episodes

References

External links

 Season One Episode list with detailed synopses at the Official Ninja Turtles website

2003 American television seasons
2004 American television seasons
Season 2
American children's animated space adventure television series
American children's animated comic science fiction television series
Television shows set in Massachusetts
Television series set on fictional planets
Usagi Yojimbo